Kim Song-jun is a North Korean former footballer. He represented North Korea on at least one occasion in 1989.

Career statistics

International

References

Date of birth unknown
Living people
North Korean footballers
North Korea international footballers
Association football forwards
Year of birth missing (living people)